Jens Glad Balchen (20 April 1926 – 12 April 2009) was a Norwegian engineer. He was born in Kristiansand and graduated from the Norwegian Institute of Technology and the Yale University. He was appointed professor of cybernetics at the Norwegian Institute of Technology from 1962. His research included projects in medicine, on aquaculture and on dynamic positioning of ships and platforms. He was decorated Commander of the Order of St. Olav in 1996.

References

1926 births
2009 deaths
People from Kristiansand
20th-century Norwegian engineers
Norwegian Institute of Technology alumni
Yale University alumni
Academic staff of the Norwegian Institute of Technology